Alfred is a town in York County, Maine, United States. As of the 2020 census, the town population was 3,073. Alfred is the seat of York County and home to part of the Massabesic Experimental Forest. National Register of Historic Places has two listings in the town, the Alfred Historic District, with 48 houses, and the Alfred Shaker Historic District.

Villages in the town include Alfred, Alfred Mills, and North Alfred. The town is part of the Portland–South Portland–Biddeford metropolitan statistical area.

History

Abenaki Native Americans called the area Massabesic, meaning "large pond," or "the place of much water." It was in the western portion of a large tract of land purchased from Indian chiefs Fluellin, Hombinowitt and Meeksombe (also known as Captain Sunday), between 1661 and 1664 by Major William Phillips, an owner of mills in Saco (which then included Biddeford). According to historian Jim Brunelle, editor of the Maine Almanac, the price was "two large blankets, two gallons of rum, two pounds of powder, four pounds of musket balls, 20 strings of beads and several other articles."

Simeon Coffin of Newbury, Massachusetts arrived in 1764 and lived for a time in a wigwam, although the first permanent settlement took place in 1770. Known as the north parish of Sanford, the community was set off and incorporated as a district on February 4, 1794. Sawmills and gristmills operated by water power at the streams. A log jail was built in 1803, with a brick jail in 1869. The courthouse was built in 1806, the year Alfred became the shire town of York County. It was incorporated as a town in 1808, named in honor of King Alfred the Great. Land would be set off to Sanford in 1828, and annexed from Waterboro in 1847. The Rochester & Portland Railroad entered from Waterboro in 1864, connecting to Rochester, New Hampshire in 1871. More than 30 trains passed through Alfred daily between 1910 and 1920, but use would decline in the age of automobiles. Passenger service ceased in 1949, with the final train departing in 1961. A severe drought in Maine tindered the Great Fires of 1947, burning  of woodland and two residences in the town.

A Shaker religious community once thrived in Alfred (now the Alfred Shaker Historic District). In 1783, members of the Shaker Church settled on the hill near Massabesic (now Shaker) Pond. Others dubbed them the "Merry Dancers," because of their ecstatic worship. "They were," as historian George J. Varney writes, "at this time fanatical in religion and intemperate in their indulgences."

In 1872, the District No. 5 School was built in northern Alfred. It was used as a school until 1921, thereafter providing a number of community functions. It was listed on the National Register of Historic Places in 2009.

In 1873 Louis H. F. Wagner rowed out to Smuttynose Island in the Isles of Shoals, off the Atlantic coast near Kittery, intending to rob but eventually murdering two of the three women left alone on the island. When the authorities finally caught up with him, jurisdiction for the case was given to York County and the county seat, Alfred. The biggest trial in the state at that time was held in the Alfred Court House.

Wagner having little defense was quickly found guilty and sentenced to be hanged on the gallows of the Maine State Prison at Thomaston. While he was awaiting transfer he broke out of the Alfred jail and made his escape, eventually being caught in Farmington, New Hampshire.

Geography

Alfred is drained by the Middle Branch of the Mousam River, Littlefield River, Hay Brook and Trafton Brook. The highest point in town is on Fort Ridge, elevation , at the Shapleigh line.

Demographics

2010 census

As of the census of 2010, there were 3,019 people, 1,175 households, and 769 families residing in the town. The racial makeup of the town was 97.5% White, 0.7% African American, 0.5% Native American, 0.2% Asian, 0.1% from other races, and 1.0% from two or more races. Hispanic or Latino of any race were 0.7% of the population.

There were 1,175 households, of which 25.2% had children under the age of 18 living with them, 53.2% were married couples living together, 7.9% had a female householder with no husband present, 4.3% had a male householder with no wife present, and 34.6% were non-families. 27.3% of all households were made up of individuals, and 13.5% had someone living alone who was 65 years of age or older. The average household size was 2.33 and the average family size was 2.80.

The median age in the town was 45.7 years. 17.5% of residents were under the age of 18; 7.7% were between the ages of 18 and 24; 23.7% were from 25 to 44; 32.1% were from 45 to 64; and 18.9% were 65 years of age or older. The gender makeup of the town was 51.7% male and 48.3% female.

2000 census

As of the census of 2000, there were 2,497 people, 996 households, and 682 families residing in the town. The racial makeup of the town was 98.52% White, 0.24% African American, 0.20% Native American, 0.48% Asian, and 0.56% from two or more races. Hispanic or Latino of any race were 0.12% of the population.

There were 996 households, out of which 27.5% had children under the age of 18 living with them, 59.0% were married couples living together, 7.1% had a female householder with no husband present, and 31.5% were non-families. 26.2% of all households were made up of individuals, and 13.2% had someone living alone who was 65 years of age or older. The average household size was 2.39 and the average family size was 2.88.

In the town, the population was spread out, with 21.5% under the age of 18, 6.5% from 18 to 24, 26.8% from 25 to 44, 26.1% from 45 to 64, and 19.1% who were 65 years of age or older. The median age was 42 years. For every 100 females, there were 105.9 males. For every 100 females age 18 and over, there were 104.6 males.

The median income for a household in the town was $40,583, and the median income for a family was $47,625. Males had a median income of $36,957 versus $25,026 for females. The per capita income for the town was $19,337. About 4.2% of families and 5.5% of the population were below the poverty line, including 5.8% of those under age 18 and 9.0% of those age 65 or over.

Arts and culture

Points of interest

 Alfred Shaker Museum
 Alfred Village Museum

Government

Alfred has three selectmen who manage town business. Selectmen are elected in an annual town meeting to three-year terms.

Education

Alfred's children attending public school go to Alfred Elementary School from kindergarten through fifth grade. Sixth, seventh and eighth grade students attend Massabesic Middle School in Waterboro. Ninth through twelfth graders attend Massabesic High School in Waterboro. Elementary aged students may also attend the private Unlimited Vision Montessori School.

Facilities 

The York County Jail is located in Alfred at 1 Layman Way. The jail houses inmates serving terms less than nine months and those awaiting trial for crimes committed in York County.

Alfred is also home to the York County courthouse, at 45 Kennebunk Road. Violations and crimes committed in York County are processed here.

Alfred houses the York County shelter, where the homeless and those needing assistance in York County live and work. They have a bakery that sells baked goods to the public to help financially support themselves.

Adjacent towns

 Kennebunk
 Lyman
 Sanford
 Shapleigh
 Waterboro

Notable people

 James Abbe, photographer
 Mildred Barker, musician, scholar, and Shakers eldress
 Joseph Brackett, songwriter and Shakers elder
 David R. Burns, Member of the Maine House of Representatives
 Horatio G. Herrick, sheriff of Essex County, Massachusetts
 John Holmes, U.S. Representative from Massachusetts and U.S. Senator from Maine
 Enrique Peña Nieto, President of Mexico from 2012 to 2018; learned English as a schoolboy in this town
 Harriet B. Shaw, pioneer of the mail-order business

Further reading
 Eastman, Harland H., "Alfred, Maine : The Shakers And The Village"

References

External links

 Town of Alfred, Maine 
 Alfred Elementary School
 Massabesic Experimental Forest
 Epodunk Town Profile

 
County seats in Maine
Populated places established in 1794
Portland metropolitan area, Maine
Towns in York County, Maine
Towns in Maine
1794 establishments in Massachusetts